The Six Days of Aarhus was a short-lived six-day track cycling race held annually in Aarhus, Denmark.

Kay Werner Nielsen holds the record of victories, winning 3 times.

Winners

References

External links 

Cycle races in Denmark
Six-day races
Recurring sporting events established in 1954
1954 establishments in Denmark
Defunct cycling races in Denmark
Recurring sporting events disestablished in 1961
1961 disestablishments in Denmark